A video game mascot is a mascot that is used by video game companies to promote both the company and their specific video game series and franchises. Video game mascots are sometimes considered to be similar to those at sporting events, with larger-than-life animals, such as Pikachu or Crash Bandicoot. However, some video game mascots, especially modern ones, are more human, such as Nathan Drake or Lara Croft becoming a series mascot.

There are few rules surrounding which characters are considered to be mascots for a series, but they are generally those that are featured highly in the promotional media for the game, and are often those that are known outside of the game platform. Many video game mascots have transcended their original video game series and have been promoted across multiple games and platforms.

Company/System mascots

Accolade – Bubsy

 ASCII Entertainment – Ardy Lightfoot
 Bandai Namco Entertainment – Pac-Man, Klonoa
 Capcom –  Captain Commando, Mega Man 
 Data East – Karnov

 Halfbrick Studios – Barry Steakfries

 Irem – Rocky Rodent

 Kojima Productions – Ludens
 Konami – Solid Snake
 Hudson Soft – Bomberman 
 TurboGrafx-16 – Bonk 
 PC-FX – Princess Rolfee (formerly NEC)
 LucasArts – Chuck the Plant
 Marvelous Inc. – Yumi
 Midway Games – Liu Kang
 Nintendo – Mario
 Wii, 3DS, and Switch – Miis
 Game Freak – Pikachu
 HAL Laboratory – Kirby
 Nitroplus – Super Sonico

 Rare – Mr. Pants
 Rovio Entertainment – Red
 Sega – Opa-Opa (former), Alex Kidd (former), Sonic the Hedgehog, Segata Sanshiro 
 Sonic Team – Sonic the Hedgehog

 Spike Chunsoft – Monokuma
 Sony Interactive Entertainment – Kuro and Toro, Sackboy, Nathan Drake, Kratos
 PlayStation – Polygon Man (former), Crash Bandicoot (former), Spyro the Dragon (former)  

 PlayStation 5 – Astro Bot
 Square Enix – Chocobo (Square), Slime (Enix), Moogle, Cloud Strife
 Crystal Dynamics – Gex
 Taito – Bubblun, Space Invader
 Studio MDHR – Cuphead
 Sunsoft – Aero the Acro-Bat

 Tengen – Awesome Possum
 Titus Software – Titus the Fox

 WayForward Technologies – Shantae
 Xbox Game Studios – Master Chief
 Xbox – Blinx the Time Sweeper

 Xbox 360 – Marcus Fenix
 Yacht Club Games – Shovel Knight

Specific series mascots

 808 – Hi-Fi Rush

 Angry Birds – Red
 Animal Crossing  – Villagers, Isabelle
 Ape Escape – Pipo Monkeys

 Banjo-Kazooie – Banjo & Kazooie
 Battletoads – Rash, Zitz, Pimple

 BioShock – Big Daddy
 Bomberman – Bomberman
 Bonk – Bonk

 Bubsy - Bubsy the Bobcat
 Castlevania – Simon Belmont 

 Conker – Conker the Squirrel

 Crash Bandicoot – Crash Bandicoot
 Croc – Croc

 Danganronpa – Monokuma
 Disgaea – Prinny
 Donkey Kong – Donkey Kong
 Dragon Quest – Slime

 Gex - Gex
Fallout – Vault Boy
 Fate/stay night – Saber
 Final Fantasy – Chocobo, Moogle, Cloud Strife

 Glover – Glover
 God of War – Kratos

 Halo – Master Chief

 Jet Grind Radio – Beat and Gum
 Jazz Jackrabbit – Jazz Jackrabbit
 Katamari Damacy – The King and The Prince
 Kid Icarus – Pit
 Kingdom Hearts – Sora
 Kirby – Kirby
 Klonoa – Klonoa
 LittleBigPlanet – Sackboy 

 Mega Man – Mega Man
 Mega Man Legends – Servbot 
 Metal Gear – Solid Snake

 Metroid – Samus Aran
 Minecraft – Steve, Creeper
 Mortal Kombat – Scorpion

 Pac-Man - Pac-Man
 PaRappa the Rapper – PaRappa the Rapper
 Pikmin – Pikmin and Captain Olimar
 Plants vs. Zombies – Sunflowers, Peashooters,  Zombies
 Pocky & Rocky – Pocky & Rocky
 Pokémon – Pikachu

 Q*bert – Q*bert
 Ratchet & Clank – Ratchet & Clank
 Raving Rabbids – Rabbids
 Rayman  – Rayman
 Resident Evil – Jill Valentine

Ristar – Ristar

 Skylanders – Spyro the Dragon, Master Eon
 Sly Cooper – Sly Cooper
 Sonic the Hedgehog – Sonic the Hedgehog

Space Channel 5 – Ulala
 Spyro – Spyro the Dragon
 Star Fox – Fox McCloud
 Street Fighter – Ryu

 Super Monkey Ball – AiAi
 Super Mario – Mario, Luigi

 The Legend of Zelda – Link 
 Tomb Raider – Lara Croft

 Twisted Metal – Sweet Tooth
 Uncharted – Nathan Drake

 Yoshi – Yoshi

See also
 List of computing mascots
 List of mascots

References